Zabriskie is a surname, anglicized from Zaborowskij. Notable people with the surname include:

People
Albert Zabriskie, originally Albrycht Zaborowski (1638–1711), American colonial settler
Peter Zabriskie (1721-1791)- Third Ratifying Signer to The Constitution of The United States from Bergen Co. New Jersey
Andrew C. Zabriskie (1853–1916), American businessman
Chris Zabriskie (born 1982), American composer
Christian Brevoort Zabriskie (1864–1936), American businessman
David Zabriskie (born 1986), amateur wrestler
David Zabriskie (born 1979), American cyclist
Frank Zabriskie, Scottish astronomer
George Zabriskie Gray (1837–1889), American priest
Grace Zabriskie (born 1941), American actress
Louise Zabriskie (1872-1957), American nurse
Oothout Zabriskie Whitehead (1911–1998), American actor
Steve Zabriskie (born 1947), American sports announcer
Stewart Clark Zabriskie (1937–1999), American bishop
Virginia M. Zabriskie (1927-2019), American art dealer
Peter J Zabriskie (1929- 2021) U.S. Peace Corp. Envoy to Africa appointed by John F. Kennedy

Places
Ackerman-Zabriskie-Steuben House, River Edge, New Jersey
Albert J. Zabriskie Farmhouse, Paramus, New Jersey
Edgar Zabriskie Residence, Omaha, Nebraska
Garret Zabriskie House, Haworth, New Jersey
Nicholas Zabriskie House, Washington Township, New Jersey
Rathbone-Zabriskie House, Ridgewood, New Jersey
Zabriskie-Christie House, Dumont, New Jersey
Zabriskie Gallery, New York, New York
Zabriskie House (Bard College), Cambridge, Massachusetts
Zabriskie House (Ho-Ho-Kus, New Jersey)
Zabriskie-Kipp-Cadmus House, Teaneck, New Jersey
Zabriskie, Jan (John) builder - General Von Steuben_House
Zabriskie, Peter - The Mansion House
Zabriskie Point (disambiguation)
Zabriskie Quartzite, California
Zabriskie Tenant House, Paramus, New Jersey
Zabriskie House (disambiguation)
<ref>

See also
Zborowski
Elliott Zborowski (1858–1903), American racing driver
Louis Zborowski (1895–1924), English racing driver

References 

Surnames of Polish origin